Burgess is a masculine given name which may refer to:

 Burgess Gardner (born 1936), jazz musician
 Burgess Jenkins (born 1973), film actor
 Burgess Meredith (1907–1997), American actor
 Burgess Owens (born 1951), American footballer
 Burgess Whitehead (1910–1993), American baseball player

English-language masculine given names
Given names originating from a surname